Balguy is a surname. Notable people with the surname include:

Charles Balguy (1708–1767), English physician and translator
John Balguy (1686–1748), English clergyman and philosopher
Thomas Balguy (1716–1795), English archdeacon
Thomas Balguy (headmaster) (died 1696), father of John Balguy and grandfather of Thomas Balguy above